Pavlos Beligratis (born November 16, 1977, in Athens) is a Greek beach volleyball player.

Beligratis competed at the FIVB Beach Volleyball World Tour between 2000 and 2005. In 2004 he qualified to the Summer Olympics in his hometown, Athens, alongside Athanasios Michalopoulos. During the match against the South Africans Colin Pocock and Gershon Rorich, Beligratis suffered an injury in his right leg and was forced withdraw from the Olympics before the last group stage match against Mariano Baracetti and Martín Conde, from Argentina.

References

External links
 
 
 

1977 births
Living people
Greek beach volleyball players
Olympic beach volleyball players of Greece
Beach volleyball players at the 2004 Summer Olympics
Sportspeople from Athens